Gerda Martín (born 5 September 1927) was a Chilean athlete. She competed in the women's javelin throw at the 1952 Summer Olympics.

References

External links
 

1927 births
Living people
Athletes (track and field) at the 1952 Summer Olympics
Chilean female javelin throwers
Olympic athletes of Chile
Place of birth missing (living people)